Nursing in Australia has evolved in training and regulation since the 19th century.

Nursing is now a profession in Australia, with nurses and midwives forming the largest single group (54%) of all health professionals in the country. Formerly nurses were trained in an apprentice style manner as employees of hospitals; however, since the 1990s nursing education is provided in the tertiary sector.  The foundation qualification provided by universities is now a Bachelor of Nursing, of 3–4 years of full-time study, leading to registration as a Registered General Nurse by the Australian Health Practitioner Regulation Agency (AHPRA).  A second tier of nurses, known as Enrolled Nurses (ENs), are educated in the TAFE sector in Diploma courses lasting 24 months. Enrolled nurses normally work under the direct supervision of Registered Nurses, but increasingly have the opportunity for an expanded scope of practice.  Conversion courses are available to permit ENs to upgrade to a Bachelor of Nursing.

Current Status

Nurses have a wide opportunity of practice in Australia, not being limited to working in hospitals but now undertaking a wide variety of roles.  Registered Nurses may undertake postgraduate specialist courses, enabling extended practice from areas as diverse as specialist inpatient care to roles in the community, including primary health provision, public health, and research. Nurses educated in Australia, especially those with post-graduate qualifications, are highly regarded throughout the world, enabling younger nurses to take advantage of short term working visas in many overseas countries.  Nurse salaries and working conditions in Australia are subject to Fair Work Australia; remuneration is dependent on qualifications, years of experience and the seniority of the role to which they may be appointed. Conditions of employment are often higher than the national award minimums Additional payments recognize unsociable working hours such as night shifts and weekend work, and many nurses are entitled to at least 5–6 weeks of paid annual leave per year. In addition, mandated nurse-to-patient care ratios are progressively being legislated by state governments across the country.

Legal regulation
As of 1 July 2010, in accordance with the National Registration and Accreditation Scheme, nurses are nationally regulated by the Nursing and Midwifery Board of Australia  established by the Australian Health Practitioner Regulation Agency (AHPRA).  The practice of nursing was previously governed by state and territorial nursing regulation authorities.  .

Nurses may be registered in the following categories:
 Nurse practitioner (NP)
 Registered nurse (RN)
 Enrolled nurse (EN)

An assistant in nursing (AIN) may support the work of nurses.  Assistants in Nursing are not subject to registration at the present time.  The Australian Nursing and Midwifery Federation recommends that Assistants in Nursing should be educated to at least a Certificate III level in the TAFE sector, and be subject to registration by AHPRA.

There are specific registration requirements that all new applicants and applicants renewing their registration: must meet:
 Criminal history check (international since 2015)
 Professional indemnity insurance arrangements
 English language skills
 Continuation of professional development
 Recency of practice

Historically, a "double-" or "triple-certificated sister" would have been a registered nurse who held general, midwifery, psychiatric, or other range of certificates. The post-nominal "RN (DC)" or "RN (TC)" was used by some nurses to signify this attainment.  The ability to become a Director of Nursing or "Matron" in smaller bush nursing hospitals required registration as a general nurse and midwife, with a preference for a third endorsement with a maternal and child care qualification.

Nurse practitioners

In December 2000 the first nurse practitioner was authorised to work in Australia. By 2015 there were approximately 700 practising throughout Australia. To become a nurse practitioner, application to the Nursing and Midwifery Board of Australia (NMBA) is required as a first step. The applicant is then required to provide affirmation of the following to be considered:  The general requirement for registration as a nurse practitioner (and there are variations) include general registration as a nurse (or midwife), achievement of requisite hours of supervised experience in a leading practice, which is 3 years full-time within the space of the previous 6 years; and a master's degree from an approved provider.

Education
Registration as a registered nurse now requires a Bachelor of Nursing, considered the foundation for any further specialisation within nursing. Postgraduate diplomas provide training for specialist areas.  Masters level courses are available in research and coursework streams; a specialist course has been developed to provide preparation for registration as a nurse practitioner. Professional doctorates are also available.  The Nursing and Midwifery Board of Australia lists  accredited nursing education programs available in Australia.

Australia has a long tradition of post-basic courses, usually of a six-month (minor) or twelve-month (major) duration, which included midwifery, maternal and child welfare, psychiatric, peri-operative (theatre nursing), intensive care, and coronary care in later years, as well as a myriad of other courses.  They are now provided by the university sector as masters postgraduate diplomas or post graduate certificates, depending on the length and complexity.

There are options available for hospital-trained nurses to upgrade their qualifications to a Bachelor of Nursing (post registration), while some opt instead to undertake specialist courses such as a postgraduate diploma or certification in the area of their clinical interest.

Enrolled nurses (Endorsed) complete a Diploma of Nursing and are trained in the technical and further education (TAFE) sector and also universities, although still obtaining the same degree. Course length is 18 months and includes a module that permits enrolled nurses to dispense oral, rectal and transdermal medications, as well as perform intramuscular injections, subcutaneous injections, and intradermal injections. Additional post-graduate certificates are offered, including administration of intravenous medications. Diploma (Endorsed) and Certificate nurses can attend university to gain a Bachelor of Nursing in just two years, as their previous qualification allows most to enter at second year.  Mothercraft nursing remains an additional developmental pathway for enrolled nurses.

Twenty-nine per cent of registered nurses in Australia received their first nursing qualification in a country other than Australia and nurse migration trends to Australia have seen an increase in international nurses from developing countries.

Professional titles

Under the Australian National Law, there are specific titles that are referred to as 'protected titles'. This means that only those people who are registered or endorsed, in a particular profession can use the titles associated with that profession. Nurses are regulated health professionals who go through approved training pathways to become registered to practice by the Nursing and Midwifery Board of Australia (NMBA). The National Law sets restrictions on the use of protected titles for Nurse, Registered Nurse, Enrolled Nurse, Nurse Practitioner, Midwife and Midwife Practitioner.  The NMBA operates under the auspices of the Australian Health Practitioner Regulation Authority(AHPRA). It is through the process and credentialing of registration with AHPRA that the title of registered nurse is awarded.

The courtesy title "sister" remains used by many registered nurses, both female and male, with a sense of affection, humour, or a deep respect for tradition.  Others advocate the use of gender-neutral titles. Controversy over the use of the title "sister" by nurses in Australia is not new: when Lucy Osburn was sent to Sydney by Florence Nightingale following the 1866 request by Sir Henry Parkes for Nightingale-trained nurses to be sent to the colony of Sydney at Government expense, on arrival on 5 March 1868 she gave the title of "sister" to her five nursing companions.  At the time there were strong sectarian forces at work in Sydney, and concern arose among the evangelical Protestant factions who dominated the boards of hospitals. They feared Osburn was creating a "sisterhood", especially as she did not conceal her High Church Anglican sentiments. Preference was that the Nightingale trained nurses were to be called "Head Nurses" to differentiate them from the Roman Catholic Sisters of Charity who ran St Vincent's Hospital, Sydney.

Remuneration 
Most nurses in Australia occupy positions as employees, with salaries and wages determined in accordance with Fair Work Australia. Independent Nurse Practitioners may be funded as primary health professions using the Medicare fee for service model.  Remuneration as an employee depends on factors including the role to which a nurse is appointed, additional qualifications and the years of experience in the position. 
 Nurse Practitioner: $118,419 to $123,629
 Registered Nurse: $63,468 to $92,954
 Endorsed Enrolled Nurse: $54,701 to $68,216
 Assistant in Nursing: $52,228 to $57,182 
The initial figure would be the commencing salary, then after years of experience the nurse could potentially receive the larger figure. Figures for registered and enrolled nurses range from the lowest graduate public sector salary to the top increment without higher level, advanced skill or senior roles. The salary rates above are the most current rates in Australia, which are from 1 January 2020.

History of nursing in Australia

Due to the colonial nature of early Australia, there were differences in the development of nursing in Australia in each colony (which is now a state) that enacted its own laws and regulations.  It was not until nearly 100 years after federation that consideration was given to standardisation across the country and the creation of a single register of health practitioners - previously all nurses were required to register separately in each state, which was burdensome for those who lived and worked in border regions.

NSW

Victoria

In 1901 the Victorian Trained Nurses Association was established by a meeting held at the (old) Melbourne Hospital.  The initial aims of the association were to arrange for registration of trained nurses (preferably by the Government), establish standards for training and attainment of qualifications, and promote the interests of nurses (male and female).  At that time there was almost no social security, and the association was concerned with its members having access to support in case of an accident, sickness, old age or "other necessitous circumstances".

Within 12 months the VTNA had 650 members. Nursing schools had been accredited in eight metropolitan hospitals (Alfred, Austin, Children's, Homeopathic (later Prince Henry's), Melbourne, Queen Victoria, St Vincent's, and Williamstown) and 27 country hospitals (Amherst, Ararat, Bairnsdale, Bendigo, Castlemaine, Clunes, Colac, Creswick, Echuca, Geelong, Hamilton, Horsham, Inglewood, Kyneton, Maryborough, Maldon, Mildura, Mooroopna, Nhill, Ovens (Beechworth), Port Fairy, Sale, St. Arnaud, Stawell, Wangaratta, Warracknabeal, and Wycheproof).  Formal examinations were planned to be conducted twice yearly, with the first scheduled for December 1902. 
 
By 1904 a Royal Charter had been granted resulting in the Royal Victorian Trained Nurses Association (RVTNA).  A voluntary pension fund had been established with the AMP Society, as well as a benevolent fund of £708 and a separate sickness fund. The first "post basic" course in gynaecological nursing was established at the Women's Hospital. By October 1910 it was reported in The Age that the RVTNA had 937 RNs on their register, a further 376 held double certificates, and the number of nursing training schools had increased to 40 across the state.

In early 1921 the RVTNA considered the development of a nursing diploma course being established at a university and yet successfully petitioned the Commonwealth Court of Conciliation and Arbitration to deregister an industrial body, the Australian Federated Nurses Association, on the grounds that "nursing was not an industry".  They also expressed alarm that Queensland nurses had achieved an industrial award.

It is somewhat surprising therefore that, despite the advocacy of the RVTNA, 20 years passed before Nursing in Victoria was regulated by statute in the Nurses Registration Act 1923 (No 3307) which established the Nurses Board (Vic), and prescribed minimum lengths of training which ranged from 3 to 5 years depending on the average number of occupied hospital beds. Nurses training in hospitals with an average occupancy of 40 beds or greater were eligible for registration after completing 3 years of training and passing the prescribed examinations, whereas those in country hospitals with an average occupancy of 16 beds were eligible to complete training in 4.5 years.  Existing RVTNA members were automatically included on the register.   Special provisions were made for those who had acted in the capacity of a nurse whilst on war service in World War One regardless of sex.  Registered nurses were entitled to a certificate, a badge, and, according to section 15 of the Act, a "prescribed distinctive headdress".  The Act also recognised that there were special branches of nursing, and made provision for the board to formally certify these branches with additional certification and a "special" badge.  The specialities included: gynaecological nursing, ear and eye nursing, infectious disease nursing, and any other special branch of nursing with the specific exception of midwifery.  The terms "Registered Nurse" and "Registered Trained Nurse" became protected titles for the first time in Victoria, with penalties for misuse.

Demand for nursing and midwifery services already outstripped supply, and there were concerns raised at the separate training of nursing and midwifery, particularly with respect of the Bush Nursing Hospital Association, which expressed a desire for nurses with a double certificate (i.e. nursing and midwifery).

Midwives, having previously a separate council, became subject to this board with the passing of the Midwives Act 1928 (No 3587).  Section 11 specifically forbade males from acting as midwifes.

Psychiatric Nurses, Mental Deficiency Nurses were added to the Board's purview with the passing of the Nurses and Midwives Act 1950 (No 5470).  The Nurses Board was abolished by the Nurses Act 1956 (No.6035) on 1 March 1958 and replaced by the Victorian Nursing Council.  At this time the registration badges were codified, and second tier nurses were first registered. These roles included Registered Nursing Aides (RNAs, later becoming SENs), Registered Mothercraft Nurses and Registered Nursing Aides (Tuberculosis).

The legislation was again revised in 1993, and until the national structure was placed in effect an anomaly occurred in that all nurses could claim RN status, as Section 17 of the Act created a register with 5 divisions:
RN Division 1 (formerly SRNs) were first-level nurses comprehensively trained with the potential ability to work in any branch of nursing.
RN Division 2 (formerly SENs) were second-level nurses that work under the direction of a division one or three nurse, equivalent to an enrolled nurse in other Australian states.
RN Division 3 (formerly RPNs) were nurses trained solely in psychiatric nursing.
RN Division 4 (formerly RMRNs) were nurses trained solely in institutions that cared for people with an intellectual disability. 
RN Division 5 were mothercraft nurses, enrolled nurses with post basic training in postnatal care and early parenting. 
Divisions 3, 4 and 5 were closed to new applicants so that would be, in time, only division 1 and 2 nurses, with a separate foundation qualification pertaining to each type.

Males and General Nursing in Victoria

Males had been employed in nursing-type roles for many years in asylums, principally because of the view that it was unsuitable for women to be exposed to unsavoury behaviours that might occur in male psychiatric wards.

Soon after the outbreak of the Second World War the Nurses Board made a provision for the training of males in a three-year course, or one year in a training school followed by a further two years in an Army or Navy Hospital. After the war, and in response to a severe shortage of nurses, servicemen who had worked in nursing type roles during the conflict were eligible for registration pending successful completion of the nursing registration examinations.

The first ex-serviceman and indeed the first male to sit the Victorian final general nurses board examinations did so in 1946. Fairfield Infection Diseases Hospital decided to open its doors to train male nurses in 1946, partly in response to the critical shortage of registered nurses throughout the state. The Royal Melbourne Hospital noted in 1946 that the Royal Hobart Hospital had been training males in nursing for more than 10 years, moving with what can only be described as glacial haste accepted its first male trainee four years later in 1950. The medical superintendent noted that an advantage of having male nurses was that they would not be lost to the profession due to the "havoc" of marriage.  The Austin Hospital had started employing males in nursing roles in the late 1930s, and it was reported that a male nurse with theatrical skills had produced an Ivor Novello play to raise funds for the hospital auxiliary in the late 1948.

Male nurses faced difficulties in gaining employment as general nurses for a number of reasons.  Smaller hospitals would not consider them for employment claiming they were not as efficient or as sympathetic as female nurses, could only look after male patients, and were entitled to higher rates of pay than their female counterparts. The former matron of the Royal Melbourne Hospital Jane Bell opined that the most suitable employment for male nurses was in mental hospitals, and indeed this may explain the greater proportion of males to females in psychiatric hospitals prior to the 1980s.  Mr A. Moran owned Olinda Private Hospital in Mildura in 1950, and was permitted to run the 12 bed hospital on condition that there was a double certificated sister employed at all times: men were forbidden to train as midwives. Edward Miller graduated from the St Vincent's Hospital School of Nursing in 1951. Two males graduated from the Repatriation General Hospital in March 1953, one of them, K. McMahon, topped the state examinations.

Queensland

Tasmania

South Australia

The Private Hospital, Wakefield Street in Adelaide became the first training hospital for nurses in South Australia under Alice Tibbits (1854–1932) in the late 19th century.

Western Australia

Armed Forces

History of nursing education

Prior to the transfer of nursing education to the university sector, nurses were trained in accordance with the British model of a three-year apprentice style course of theory and practice instruction in hospital nursing schools and on the wards commencing with a 6-week preliminary training school (PTS) with the earliest accepted entry age being 17 years. First, second and third-year student nurses were often differentiated by the number of stripes on their uniform caps and or belts. 
Hospital-based examinations were held each year and a successful pass meant progression to the next year and a fail meant a student nurse might face termination: although this depended on the local hospital policy.   Three years of student nursing culminated in final year exams: trial final exams were set by the training school prior to a state universal registration examination administered by the state registration body.

This apprentice-style training created a situation whereby different siloed streams of nursing were provided.  Prior to the adoption of the policy that general nursing was to be the foundation qualification for all forms of nursing, it was possible at various times to train and be registered as a psychiatric nurse (RPN) or as a mental retardation nurse (RMRN)  or midwife (RM) without general nursing training.  Graduate Nurses of such courses were permitted to practice as a State Enrolled Nurse if engaged in general nursing practice under the direction of a registered general nurse.

Student Nurses were paid employees of the parent hospital and their conditions of employment were consistent with the Registered Nurses Award. If a student nurse missed time off through sick leave over the three years of training this time was added on to be worked at the end of the three years to comply with meeting the prescribed hours of practicum. Hospitals awarded distinctive badges and veils for females upon graduation. In addition, state registering authorities awarded a badge of registration in recognition of passing the state final exams.  These were generally worn with pride on the uniform collars.

As early as the 1930s, attempts were made to establish university-credentialed nursing courses in Australia, most notably by the director of nursing at the Royal Melbourne Hospital and the University of Melbourne.  As recently as the 1980s, Sandra Stacy, one of the first Australian nurses to attain a PhD enrolled in a school of anthropology to submit her thesis.

In the late 1970s, the Royal College of Nursing Australia pioneered a course that became the Diploma of Applied Science (Nursing), awarded by the Lincoln Institute in Melbourne (now part of La Trobe University) and Cumberland College of Health Sciences in Sydney (now part of the University of Sydney). The transfer of nursing education to the university sector continued throughout the 1980s, and gradually hospital schools ceased operating. In the early 1990s, universities finally granted nursing education the same status as allied health, and awarded bachelor degrees in nursing rather than diplomas for entry-level courses.

The first move towards baccalaureate recognition was the development of the Bachelor of Applied Science (Advanced Nursing), a postgraduate degree that required registration as a registered nurse as a prerequisite to admission, and completion of 16 units. This course is no longer offered, and has been superseded by the transition of "post basic courses" conducted by various hospitals as a form of in-service training to the tertiary sector. The Australian College of Nursing still runs postgraduate certificate courses for nurses in many specialities.

The transfer of nursing education to the university sector from the hospital setting was the result of long-time efforts by leaders in Australian nursing, notably, pioneer nurse educator Merle Parkes. This was regarded with  concern by some parts of the medical profession who regarded the development of highly trained professional nurses as a threat to their authority regarding the delivery of high-level health care. Some nurses themselves opposed the transfer on the grounds that "hands-on experience in hospitals" would be lost. There has been a gradual reduction in hospital-based practicum sessions in University courses: hospitals now charge tertiary providers for student nurse placements, and governments apply funding quotas for enrolments.  The transfer to tertiary education was championed as an exercise of female emancipation.  In a society that still regarded feminism as a conspiracy that opposed a predominantly essentialist view of gender within society, this was opportunely exploited by conservative factions within medical industrial bodies.  A number of conservative people believe appropriate and separate gender roles should be respected as either "god-given" or part of the "natural order". In this case, nursing is regarded as a "female" profession and medicine as a "male" profession. Men in nursing, or so-called "male nurses" often are subject to stereotyping.  For example, the Nurses Registration Acts of both Tasmania and Victoria in the 1950s expressly forbade males from training as or practising as midwives, and was not repealed until the mid-1970s.

See also

 Australian College of Nursing
 Nurses and Midwives Tribunal, superseded complaints forum

Notes

References

Further reading

 Chiarella, M. The Legal and Professional Status of Nursing. New York: Churchill Livingstone, 2002.
 Dooley, G. The Transfer of Australian Nursing Education from Hospitals to Tertiary Institutions: An Annotated Bibliography. Bedford Park, S. Aust: South Australian College of Advanced Education Library, 1990.
 Russell, R. Lynette. From Nightingale to Now: Nurse Education in Australia. Sydney: Harcourt Brace Jovanovich, 1990.
 Schultz, Bartz. A Tapestry of Service: The Evolution of Nursing in Australia. Melbourne: Churchill Livingstone, 1991.

External links

 Department of Health - Nursing